The Finsteraarrothorn (3,530 m) is a mountains of the Bernese Alps, overlooking the Fiescher Glacier in the canton of Valais. It lies at the southeastern end of the ridge descending from the Finsteraarhorn, between the Fiescher Glacier and the Studer Glacier.

References

External links
 Finsteraarrothorn on Hikr

Bernese Alps
Mountains of Switzerland
Mountains of the Alps
Alpine three-thousanders
Mountains of Valais